Ira G. "Babe" Hanford (February 24, 1918 – November 21, 2009) was an American jockey. He rode the winning horse Bold Venture in the 1936 Kentucky Derby. The colt he rode while still an apprentice was owned and bred by Morton L. Schwartz and trained by Hall of Fame inductee, Max Hirsch.

His career was interrupted by four years of service with the United States Army during World War II.

Ira Hanford died of cancer on November 21, 2009, in Ocala, Florida at age 91. He was the brother of Kelso's Hall of Fame trainer, Carl Hanford.

External link
 Photos of 1) Ira Hanford & Jim Braddock and 2) Carl & Ira Hanford

References

1918 births
2009 deaths
Deaths from cancer in Florida
American jockeys
United States Army personnel of World War II
People from Fairbury, Nebraska